Königswalzer may refer to:

 Königswalzer (1935 film)
 Königswalzer (1955 film)